Union County is the name of seventeen counties in the United States:

 Union County, Arkansas
 Union County, Florida
 Union County, Georgia
 Union County, Illinois
 Union County, Indiana
 Union County, Iowa
 Union County, Kentucky
 Union County, Mississippi
 Union County, New Jersey, the most populous Union County in the country
 Union County, New Mexico
 Union County, North Carolina
 Union County, Ohio
 Union County, Oregon
 Union County, Pennsylvania
 Union County, South Carolina
 Union County, South Dakota
 Union County, Tennessee

See also
 Union Parish, Louisiana